Kuhin is a city in Qazvin Province, Iran.

Kuhin may also refer to:
 Kuhin, Hamadan
 Kuhin, Markazi
 Kuhin District, in Qazvin Province
 Kuhin Rural District, in Hamadan Province